Zollicoffer's Law Office is a historic office building located at Henderson, Vance County, North Carolina.  It was built in 1887, and is a two-story, two bay by two bay, brick building with Italianate style design elements.  It is associated with A.C. Zollicoffer, who was prominent in local and regional legal, political, and business circles.

It was listed on the National Register of Historic Places in 1978. It is located in the Henderson Central Business Historic District.

See also 
 Alfred Moore Scales Law Office: NRHP listing in Madison, North Carolina
 Brown-Cowles House and Cowles Law Office: NRHP listing in Wilkesboro, North Carolina
 Thomas B. Finley Law Office: NRHP listing in Wilkesboro, North Carolina
 Archibald Henderson Law Office: NRHP listing in Salisbury, North Carolina
 Nash Law Office: NRHP listing in Hillsborough, North Carolina
 National Register of Historic Places listings in Vance County, North Carolina

References

Office buildings on the National Register of Historic Places in North Carolina
Italianate architecture in North Carolina
Commercial buildings completed in 1887
Buildings and structures in Vance County, North Carolina
National Register of Historic Places in Vance County, North Carolina
Historic district contributing properties in North Carolina
Individually listed contributing properties to historic districts on the National Register in North Carolina
Law offices
Legal history of North Carolina